The Starling is a breed of fancy pigeon, developed over many years of selective breeding. They are known for their iridescent feathers. Starlings, along with other varieties of domesticated pigeons, are all descendants from the rock pigeon (Columba livia).

See also

List of pigeon breeds

References

Pigeon breeds